Oława railway station is a station in Oława, Lower Silesian Voivodeship, Poland.

In 2009, the Oława railway station's renovation was completed, preserving the station's historic attributes originating from 1842. The modernisation included that of the 10 km of rail and electric lines in the station's proximity. The reconstruction also included the reconstruction of the bridge crossing the River Oder and road viaducts.

Oława remains the oldest railway station in use in Poland, having been built in 1842, together with the Wrocław-Oława railway line.

Connections 

132 Bytom - Wrocław Główny

Train services
The station is served by the following service(s):

Intercity services (IC) Ustka - Koszalin - Poznań - Wrocław - Opole - Bielsko-Biała
Intercity services (IC) Bydgoszcz - Poznań - Leszno - Wrocław - Opole - Rybnik - Bielsko-Biała - Zakopane
Regional services (PR) Wrocław Główny - Oława - Brzeg
Regional services (PR) Wrocław Główny - Oława - Brzeg - Nysa
Regional service (PR) Wrocław - Oława - Brzeg - Nysa - Kędzierzyn-Koźle
Regional services (PR) Wrocław Główny - Oława - Brzeg - Opole Główne
Regional service (PR) Wrocław - Oława - Brzeg - Opole Główne - Kędzierzyn-Koźle
Regional service (PR) Wrocław - Oława - Brzeg - Opole Główne - Kędzierzyn-Koźle - Racibórz
Regional service (PR) Wrocław - Oława - Brzeg - Opole Główne - Gliwice

References 

Oława County
Railway stations in Lower Silesian Voivodeship
Railway stations in Poland opened in 1842